Bardla (also Romanized as Bardlā; also known as Bardāleh, Bard Allāh, Bard-e-Allāh, and Bardollāh) is a village in Aghili-ye Jonubi Rural District, Aghili District, Gotvand County, Khuzestan Province, Iran. At the 2006 census, its population was 321, in 59 families.

References 

Populated places in Gotvand County